The Alameda Mole was a transit and transportation facility in Alameda, California for ferries landing in the East Bay of San Francisco from 1878 to the 1930s.  It was located on the west end of Alameda, and later became part of the Alameda Naval Air Station.  It was one of four neighbouring moles.  The others were the Oakland Mole, the WP Mole (Western Pacific), and the Key System Mole.  The purpose of the mole was to extend tracks of rail-based transportation lines beyond the shallow mud flats along the shore of the East Bay into water deep enough to accommodate the passenger and rail ferries to San Francisco.

History

The mole was originally built by the South Pacific Coast Railroad in 1876-1878 to serve as the northern terminal of its narrow-gauge railroad to Santa Cruz. The Southern Pacific acquired the mole by lease in 1887. The mole burned to the water on November 20, 1902 and was rebuilt larger and farther out into the bay. It was dual gauged (both narrow and standard gauge) starting in 1898 and fully standard gauged after 1906.

Oakland's worst railroad disaster of the nineteenth century occurred on the Alameda Mole on May 30, 1890.  A Southern Pacific Railroad passenger train headed for Oakland fell into the estuary after failing to stop for the open drawbridge at Webster Street.  The drawbridge had been opened to allow a ship to pass.  Thirteen people were killed and many injured.

The Alameda Mole was used by: (i) local trolley cars (such as the Red Line), (ii) ferries to San Francisco, (iii) regular trains running in a horseshoe pattern (dubbed the Horseshoe Line) to the Oakland Mole, (iv) local steam commuter lines of the Southern Pacific Railroad (initially, the narrow gauge South Pacific Coast Railroad — later the standard gauge Southern Pacific Railroad) which were later transformed into the East Bay Electric Lines. Southern Pacific's electrified trains were not streetcars, but full-sized railroad cars which connected to the mainland by bridges at Webster Street and Fruitvale. The trains ran to both the Oakland Mole and the Alameda Mole.

In the 1930s Pan American Airways established a seaplane port along the fill that led to the Alameda Mole. This was the original home base for the China Clipper. With the advent of World War II, a vast stretch of the marshy area southwest of the Alameda Mole was filled and the Naval Air Station Alameda established. This major Naval facility included a large airfield and docks for several aircraft carriers. It closed in 1997.

See also
 Alameda Terminal
 Ferries of San Francisco Bay
 Oakland Long Wharf

Notes

External links
Antique postcard photos of Alameda from alamedainfo.com
Antique maps of Alameda from alamedainfo.com
Antique image of San Francisco Bay, with East Bay moles visible

Piers in California
Buildings and structures in Alameda, California
Transportation buildings and structures in Alameda County, California
Railway stations in Alameda County, California
Former railway stations in California
Railway stations in the United States opened in 1878
1878 establishments in California
Ferry terminals in the San Francisco Bay Area
Demolished railway stations in the United States